Todd Jordan (born June 18, 1970) is the mayor of Tupelo, Mississippi. He is a former Canadian football punter who played one season with the San Antonio Texans of the Canadian Football League. He played college football at Mississippi State University. He was also a member of the Las Vegas Posse.

Football career

College career
Jordan played for the Mississippi State Bulldogs as a quarterback and punter from 1989 to 1993. He recorded 2,741 yards and fourteen touchdowns while completing 205 of 440 passes during his college career. He also accumulated 4,793 punting yards on 112 punts.

College Statistics

Professional career
Jordan was on the Las Vegas Posse's practice roster in 1994 and became a free agent when the team folded. He played in eighteen games for the San Antonio Texans as the team's punter during the 1995 season. He recorded 4,459 punting yards on 107 punts.

References

External links
Just Sports Stats

Living people
1970 births
Players of American football from Mississippi
American football quarterbacks
American football punters
Canadian football punters
Canadian football quarterbacks
American players of Canadian football
Mississippi State Bulldogs football players
San Antonio Texans players
Sportspeople from Tupelo, Mississippi